The men's jianshu / qiangshu all-around competition at the 2008 Beijing Wushu Tournament was held on August 23 at the Olympic Sports Center Gymnasium.

Background 
Liu Yang, Lim Yew Lai, and Nguyễn Huy Thành were the projected favorites for the competition, as they were the top-three placing athletes in the combined score ranking at the 2007 World Wushu Championships. Another favorite was Gogi Nebulana as he won the gold medal in jianshu at the 2007 world championships, but was ranked fifth in the combined score rankings. Gold medalist in qiangshu, Hei Zhi Hong, would have been another favorite, but he opted to compete in the men's taijiquan event.

At the Beijing Wushu Tournament, the final rankings were nearly identical to the results at the 2007 world championships.

Schedule 
All times are Beijing Time (UTC+08:00)

Results 
Both events were judged without the degree of difficulty component.

References

External links 

 Official website

Men's_jianshu_and_qiangshu